Tundra is the debut solo studio album by Norwegian singer Anneli Drecker, released on 27 March 2000 by EMI.

Background
Tundra gives an excursion into a more diverse soundscape within the genres electronica and rock. After the international efforts of Bel Canto stranded in the second half of the 1990s, it seems quite natural that she start a solo career.

Reception

The reviewer Håkon Molset of the Norwegian newspaper Dagbladet awarded the album dice 4.

Track listing
All lyrics and music by Anneli Drecker, except "Tundra (Mánaiga)" (lyrics by Lawra Somby and Drecker) and "Song of the Sky Loom" (lyrics from a Native American poem from Tewa).

Personnel

Musicians

 Anneli Drecker – vocals ; keyboards ; programming ; orchestral arrangement ; string arrangement ; grand piano 
 Torbjørn Brundtland – programming ; FX ; keyboards ; choir 
 Martin Horntveth – brushes ; drums 
 Niels J. Røine – Jew's harp 
 Sindre Hotvedt – orchestral arrangement ; transcription ; additional keyboards, additional orchestral arrangement ; string arrangement 
 City of Prague Philharmonic Orchestra – strings 
 Mario Klemens – conducting 
 Sjur Miljeteig – trumpet 
 Will Foster – additional string arrangement 
 Sarah Wilson – strings 
 Howard Gott – strings 
 Ruth Gottlieb – strings 
 Oliver Kraus – strings 
 Lawra Somby – joik 
 Roger Ludvigsen – runebomme 
 Röyksopp – programming 
 Lauren Waaktaar-Savoy – vocals, choir 
 Jon Marius Aareskjold – choir 
 Per Martinsen – soundscapes 
 Nils Petter Molvær – trumpet 
 Sivert Høyem – guest vocals 
 Hans Magnus Ryan – guitars 
 Bent Sæther – bass 
 Tromsø Symphony Orchestra – orchestra

Technical
 Anneli Drecker – production 
 Ulf W. Ø. Holand – mixing 
 Nils Johansen – vocal recording ; vocal editing ; recording, mixing 
 Jon Marius Aareskjold – Pro Tools ; vocal recording 
 Torbjørn Brundtland – co-production ; additional production 
 Simon Raymonde – production, recording, mixing 
 Souvenire – vocal recording 
 Röyksopp – co-production 
 Trond Mikalsen – recording, mixing

Artwork
 Anneli Drecker – art direction
 Aina Griffin – art direction, design, photography
 Marte Garmann Johnsen – Prague photos
 Iris Marie Persdotter Drecker – illustrations

Charts

Notes

References

External links
 

2000 debut albums
Anneli Drecker albums
EMI Records albums